Triplarina bancroftii is a species of flowering plant in the myrtle family, Myrtaceae and is endemic to a restricted area of Queensland. It is a shrub with egg-shaped or elliptic leaves, flowers with five sepals and five relatively small white petals and sixteen to eighteen stamens.

Description

Taxonomy and naming
Triplarina bancroftii was first formally described by Anthony Bean in 1995 and the description was published in the journal Austrobaileya from specimens he collected in Cania Gorge National Park in 1993. The specific epithet (bancroftii) honours Thomas Lane Bancroft, the first person to collect this species.

Distribution and habitat
It grows in sandy soil with species such as Lophostemon confertus and L. suaveolens.

Conservation status
Triplarina bancroftii is classified as of "least concern" under the Queensland Government Nature Conservation Act 1992.

References

bancroftii
Flora of Queensland
Plants described in 1995
Taxa named by Anthony Bean